Jönköpings SS is a Swedish swim team from Jönköping. The team is one of the oldest in Sweden, founded in 1829.

They train in Rosenlundsbadet, arena for the 1977 European Aquatics Championships.

Swimmers
Eva Berglund

External links
Jönköpings SS's official homepage 

Swimming clubs in Sweden
1829 establishments in Sweden
Sports clubs established in the 1820s
Sport in Jönköping County
Clubs and societies in Sweden